Callington Town Football Club is a football club based in Callington, Cornwall, England.

History
The club was established in 1989 and joined the East Cornwall Combination the following year. They were runners-up in 1994–95 and went on to win back-to-back league titles in 1997–98 and 1998–99. After their second East Cornwall Combination title they moved up to the South Western League, where they spent several seasons in lower-mid table, finishing bottom of the league in 2003–04.

In 2007 Callington became founder members of the South West Peninsula League, and were placed in Division One West. In 2013–14 the club won the division, earning promotion to the Premier Division; they also won the Cornwall Charity Cup, beating Dobwalls 1–0 in the final after extra time. The following season saw them win the league's Charity Vase with a win over Stoke Gabriel. Following league reorganisation at the end of the 2018–19 season, the club were placed in the Premier Division West.

Ground
The club play their home games at Marshfield Parc.

Honours
South West Peninsula League
Division One West Champions 2013–14
Charity Vase winners 2014–15
East Cornwall Combination
Champions 1997–98, 1998–99
Cornwall Charity Cup
Winners 2013–14

References

External links

Official website

Football clubs in Cornwall
Football clubs in England
Association football clubs established in 1989
1989 establishments in England
East Cornwall League
South Western Football League
South West Peninsula League
Callington